Nessa may refer to:

People 

Nessa, American radio and TV personality
Nessa Morgan, New Zealand born, Australian R&B singer
Nessa Childers (born 1956), Irish Labour Party (S&D) politician
Nessa Feddis (born 1958), American attorney and banking industry spokesperson
Ludvig Nessa (born 1949), Norwegian priest

Places 
Nessa (Kültepe), a variant name (spelling) of the ancient city of Nesha, in Anatolia
Nessa, Haute-Corse, a commune in the Haute-Corse département in France, on the island of Corsica
Nessa, Saxony-Anhalt, a town in the district Burgenlandkreis in Saxony-Anhalt in Germany

Companies 

Nessa Records, a jazz record label

Fiction and mythology
 Nessa (Middle-earth), a Vala in J. R. R. Tolkien's Eä universe
 Nessa Jenkins, a character in the BBC television series Gavin & Stacey
 Nessa Warner, a character the British television soap opera Coronation Street
 Nessarose, a character in the musical Wicked, sometimes known by as Nessa
 Conchobar mac Nessa, the king of Ulster in the Ulster cycle of Irish mythology
 Ness (Irish mythology), a legendary Irish princess
Nessa, a Gym Leader in Pokémon Sword and Shield

Insect
 Nessa (insect), a genus of crickets in the tribe Podoscirtini

See also
 Vanessa (disambiguation), a name that is shortened to Nessa